Mecistogaster modesta is a species of narrow-winged damselfly in the family Coenagrionidae. It is found in Central America.

Subspecies
These two subspecies belong to the species Mecistogaster modesta:
 Mecistogaster modesta iphigenia Selys, 1886
 Mecistogaster modesta modesta Selys, 1860

References

Further reading

 

Coenagrionidae
Articles created by Qbugbot
Insects described in 1860